Royal Excel Mouscron, commonly known as Mouscron or familiarly as REM, was a Belgian professional football club based in Mouscron.

The team was formed as Royal Mouscron-Péruwelz in the spring of 2010 as a result of the merging between bankrupt R.E. Mouscron and R.R.C. Peruwelz. Its current name was adopted in the summer of 2016.

History
Following the liquidation and break-up of R.E. Mouscron, whose registration number was removed by the Royal Belgian Football Association, the city of Mouscron began negotiations with leaders of R.R.C. Peruwelz about a possible merge. After weeks of hesitation and uncertainty, an agreement was reached. The agreement was officially signed and announced on 11 March 2010. Debts of about €100,000 in R.R.C. Peruwelz's name were cleared while the city agreed to maintain the training center known as "Futurosport". The newly merged club, Royal Mouscron-Péruwelz, took on the history of R.R.C. Peruwelz, receiving matricule number 216 and keeping red and blue as its main colors. In its first season, it participated in Belgian Promotion A, the 4th level of Belgian football. After a strong season, they were promoted to the Belgian Third Division for the 2011–12 season, playing in Division A. They had reached Round 6 of the 2011–12 Belgian Cup before losing narrowly to Belgian Pro League club Beerschot AC on penalties 4–3. They finished first in their division in league play, and thus were promoted to the Belgian Second Division. The next season Mouscron-Péruwelz finished 2nd and qualified for the promotion play-offs but lost. In the 2014 play-offs Mouscron-Péruwelz wound up 4th and qualified yet again; this time they won the play-offs, promoting them to the highest division of Belgian football for the first time in their history, bringing back top tier football to Mouscron after a 5-year absence. In 2016, the name of the club was changed to Royal Excel Mouscron.

In 2022, the club was dissolved because of a financial reason.

References

External links
  
 
  

 
Football clubs in Belgium
Association football clubs established in 1922
Association football clubs disestablished in 2022
1922 establishments in Belgium
Sport in Mouscron
Belgian Pro League clubs
2022 disestablishments in Belgium